Eastwood Field is a minor league baseball stadium located in Niles, Ohio, United States. It is currently the home of the Mahoning Valley Scrappers, a collegiate summer baseball team of the MLB Draft League.

History
Eastwood Field opened for the  season, when the Erie SeaWolves franchise was relocated to Niles upon the granting of an expansion Eastern League franchise to Erie. With an official seating capacity is 6,000, the park was originally known as Cafaro Field, named for William M. Cafaro, founder of the real estate developer the Cafaro Company. The name was changed to Eastwood Field in 2003 to match the Eastwood Mall, a Cafaro property on U.S. Route 422, behind which the ballpark was built. On August 14, 2012, the stadium hosted the 2012 New York-Penn All Star Game. In 2015, the Fall Experimental Football League announced the Boston Brawlers franchise would relocate and play its home games at Eastwood Field as the Mahoning Valley Brawlers, however, the team would cease operations prior to its first game.

Tenants and events
Eastwood Field also plays home to the Youngstown State Penguins baseball team and the Inter-Tri County League Senior baseball game. In addition to baseball, the stadium hosts a number of concerts and other entertainment events each year. These acts include Bad Company, Nelly, Kool and the Gang, The Beach Boys, Kenny Rogers and Foreigner.

See also
 List of NCAA Division I baseball venues

References

External links
Eastwood Field Website
Eastwood Field – Mahoning Valley Scrappers
Eastwood Field – Youngstown State
Eastwood Field Views – Ball Parks of the Minor Leagues 

Minor league baseball venues
Sports venues in Ohio
Buildings and structures in Trumbull County, Ohio
Tourist attractions in Trumbull County, Ohio
Youngstown State Penguins baseball
Niles, Ohio
College baseball venues in the United States
1999 establishments in Ohio
Sports venues completed in 1999